is a town located in Kishima District, Saga Prefecture, Japan. It is known as a crossroads for railways and national highways, and as such has dubbed itself "the navel of Saga". As of October 1, 2016, the town has an estimated population of 9,524.

Geography
Mountains: The northern part of the city is gradually mountainous.
Rivers: Rokkaku River, Ushizu River

Adjoining Municipalities
Ogi
Ōmachi
Shiroishi 
Taku

History
April 1, 1932 - The villages of Oda (小田村), Yamaguchi (山口村), and Sarushi (佐留志村) merge to form the village of Kōhoku.
April 1, 1952- The village of Kōhoku gains town status.
September 30, 1956 - Part of the village of Teisen (砥川村) from Ogi District merges with Kōhoku.

Education
Kōhoku Junior High School (江北町立江北中学校)
Kōhoku Elementary School (江北町立江北小学校)

Transportation

Air
The closest airport is Saga Airport.

Rail
Station(s): Kōhoku
Lines: Nagasaki Main Line, Sasebo Line
To Major Cities
To Fukuoka, as well as the nearest Shinkansen station:
About 45 minutes by the limited express Kamome
About 1 hour and 40 minutes by local train, changing at Tosu
To Nagasaki: About 1 hour and 10 minutes by limited express, about 2 hours and 10 minutes by local train
To Sasebo: About 55 minutes by limited express, about 1 hour and 10 minutes by local train

Road
Expressways: None
National Highway: Route 34, Route 207
Prefectural Roads: Saga Prefectural Route 35

References

External links

 Kōhoku official website 

Towns in Saga Prefecture